Eupholus  petitii is a disputed species of beetle belonging to the  family Curculionidae.

Taxonomy
Eupholus petitii is now considered by some authors a subspecies of Eupholus schoenherri.

Etymology
The species name schoenherri honours the Swedish entomologist Carl Johan Schönherr.

Distribution
This species can be found in New Guinea

Description
Eupholus (schoenherri) petiti is usually metallic bright blue-green, with four transverse unequally spaced black shining bands on elytra. The last band is strongly arched. Antennae are  club-shaped, it has a longitudinal groove on the vertex  and the extremity of thighs is blue. The blue-green colour derives from very small scales, covering all over the elytra.

References

Entiminae
Insects of Papua New Guinea
Endemic fauna of Papua New Guinea
Taxa named by Félix Édouard Guérin-Méneville
Beetles described in 1841